Sam Willetts (born 1962) is an English poet. He was born and raised in Oxford. His father Harry Willetts was a noted scholar and translator of Russian at St. Antony's College, Oxford. Sam studied English at Wadham College. He has struggled with drug addiction and homelessness. His first book of poems New Light for the Old Dark (2010) was nominated for the Forward Prize, the Costa Prize and the TS Eliot Prize.

References

1962 births
Living people
People from Oxford
Alumni of Wadham College, Oxford
English male poets